Upper Adams River Provincial Park is a provincial park in British Columbia, Canada.

References

Provincial parks of British Columbia
Parks in the Shuswap Country
Monashee Mountains